is an animated Japanese television series, based on Herman Melville's 1851 novel Moby-Dick. However, this adaptation used futuristic outer space as the setting, with "whales" being large abandoned spaceships instead. It aired from 1997 to 1999, albeit with a suspension of new episodes from November 1997 to October 1998. The series ran for 26 episodes, which have been released on DVD in the US by ADV Films, spread across six discs.

Plot
In space, the only source of income to space pirates, are hunting "whales", which are giant robotic spaceships drifting in space that are rich in resources when successfully captured. Ahab, a pirate captain was obsessed on a particular white whale, Moby Dick. But things change when Lucky joined his motley crew of pirates and refugees.

Characters

Main characters
 Due

 He is an android for planet development whose registration number is ESP4678-201.

 Ahab

 His real name is Ahab Ishmael Ali. 35 years old. The captain of a spacecraft Lady Whisker.
Ahab has a deep hatred for Moby Dick because it took his left eye and left leg from him, following an attack Ahab led on an unregistered ship (which turned out to be carrying civilians).

 Lucky

 14-year-old girl who stows away on the Lady Whisker to gain Ahab's assistance in saving her planet Moad from the Federation and their ultimate weapon Moby Dick. Upon being Discovered by the crew Lucky begs to join them as a whale hunter, following a test in which Lucky had to retrieve a coin at the bottom of a well filled with water (which had been filled with a liquid that makes a person sink not float), Lucky was saved by Ahab but managed to retrieve the coin. Having proven herself, Lucky becomes an Apprentice Whale Hunter under Atre's supervision, and soon earns the respect of the other crew members including captain Ahab. Brave and resourceful, Lucky quickly settled into life onboard Lady Whisker, while still hiding the fact that she was a girl. After being found out however she begs Ahab to save her planet from the Federation which Ahab accepts upon learning that Moby Dick is involved.

Ahab Whaling Company
 Atre

 11 years old probationer. Atre has a great respect for Ahab and aspires to be like him, this is partly because of his father who served the captain as his right hand for many years before his death. Atre takes Lucky on as an Apprentice Whale Hunter, the two eventually becomes good friends. After finding out that Lucky was a girl, it appears that Atre has a crush on her.

 Doc

 Doc Christiansen. The chief doctor, Ahab’s right arm.

 Cook

 The chief cook.

 Barba

 The progeny of the Tattoo tribe which is the dauntless aborigine of the Daimama star.

 Speed King

 An able pilot. A former racer.

 Mutz

 A swordsman.

 Academias

 The mechanic supervisor.

Lucy

 The loyal bird of Captain Ahab, it delivers messages to the crew and is usually seen around Lucky and Atre.

The Federal Police
 White Hat

 A detective of the First Investigation Division of Federal Police 86th Precinct.

Planet Moad
 Sara

 A singer. A woman model android.

 Shiro

 Shiro Tokisada. The leader of resistance group of planet Moad. Lucky’s elder brother.

 Lisa

 The member of the resistance group of Planet Moad.

 Garcia

 The former worker of the 16th mining area of Planet Moad. 67 years old.

 Mika

 Mika Michelle Idha. The girl who belongs to planet Moad, resistance.

Earth Federation
 Murato

 The captain of the Moad garrison. A giant android measuring 3 meters tall.

 Ohara

 Jane Ohara. A special adviser of the planet development of the Earth Federation.

 General Ho

 The commander of the Seventh Fleet of the Earth Federation expeditionary forces. The 14th son of the new president.

 Moby Dick

 Super space battleship of Earth Federales. It was remodeled into the planet extinction weapon later and floats on Moad orbit.

Others
 Marie

 A women's college student of the planet Cape God. She stowed away on Lady Whisker and who is in love with Ahab.

External links

1997 anime television series debuts
Action anime and manga
ADV Films
Adventure anime and manga
Works based on Moby-Dick
Odex
Science fiction anime and manga